The discography of Eyes Set to Kill, an American rock band, includes six studio albums, two extended plays, one demo, nineteen singles, and fourteen music videos.

Studio albums

Extended plays

DVDs

Demos

Singles

Music videos

Featured singles

References

External links

Rock music group discographies
Discographies of American artists